NGC 1755 (also known as ESO 56-SC28) is an open star cluster in the Large Magellanic Cloud in the Dorado constellation. It is about 120 light years across and due to its size could be a globular cluster. It has a diameter of 2.6′ and an apparent magnitude of 9.9. It was discovered by James Dunlop in 1826.

References

External links
 

Dorado (constellation)
ESO objects
1755
Open clusters
Astronomical objects discovered in 1826
Large Magellanic Cloud